Kearney Park is an unincorporated community and census-designated place located on Livingston-Vernon Road in western Madison County, Mississippi. Kearney Park is part of the Jackson Metropolitan Statistical Area.

Kearney Park has a zip code of 39071.

Demographics

Education
Madison County School District is the local school district.

It is zoned to East Flora Elementary. Residents are in turn zoned to Madison Middle School, Rosa Scott 9th Grade, and Madison Central High School.

References

Unincorporated communities in Madison County, Mississippi
Unincorporated communities in Mississippi
Census-designated places in Madison County, Mississippi